Izoplit is an urban locality (an urban-type settlement) in Konakovsky District of Tver Oblast, Russia. It is located in a swampy area, adjacent to the nature reserve of Zavidovo. Population:

History
In 1930, the peat extraction in the area started, and the plant Izoplit started operation. The settlement was founded to host the plant workers. At the time, it was a part of Zavidovsky District of Moscow Oblast. On January 29, 1935 Kalinin Oblast was established, and Zavidovsky District was transferred to Kalinin Oblast. During World War II, Redkino was occupied by German troops for a month in November-December 1941. In 1946, it was granted urban-type settlement status. On November 14, 1960 the district was abolished and merged into Konakovsky District. On February 13, 1963, during the abortive Khrushchyov administrative reform, Konakovsky District was merged into Kalininsky District, but on January  12, 1965 it was re-established. In 1990, Kalinin Oblast was renamed Tver Oblast.

Economy

Industry
The settlement was built to serve the eponymous plant which produced construction blocks with improved thermal isolation. By 2013 the plant, which employed virtually the whole population of Izoplit, went bankrupt, and in late 2013, it was sold to the Finnish company Paroc OY AB and reopened.

Transportation
It belongs to the Leningradsky suburban railway line and is connected by regular passenger suburban service with both Moscow (Moscow Leningradsky railway station) and Tver. There is a railway branch between Redkino and Izoplit, but it is not used for passenger traffic. The settlement is connected by the outside world by one road which goes to Redkino and has access to the M10 highway connecting Moscow and Saint Petersburg.

References

Notes

Sources

Urban-type settlements in Tver Oblast